Caleb University is a private university located in Imota, Lagos State ,Nigeria.It was founded in 2007.

References

External links 
Universities in Nigeria
Caleb  University Official Website

Universities and colleges in Nigeria
1995 establishments in Nigeria